Hyposmocoma kaupo is a species of moth of the family Cosmopterigidae. It is endemic to Maui. The type locality is the Kaupo Gap area of east Maui, where it was collected at an altitude of 1,085 meters.

The wingspan is 12.2–13.3 mm.

Adults were reared from case-making larvae. Larvae were collected on lichen covered rocks in the Kaupo Gap area of east Maui. Larvae were observed feeding and were reared on lichens growing on rocks. While a few larvae were actively crawling and feeding on the rocks during the day when we were collecting, most were hidden near the base of the rocks where grass partially concealed them.

External links
Three new species of Hyposmocoma (Lepidoptera, Cosmopterigidae) from the Hawaiian Islands, based on morphological and molecular evidence

K
Endemic moths of Hawaii
Biota of Maui
Moths described in 2008